Maulana Muhammad Musa Bazi Rouhani (1935- 19 October 1998) was an Islamic philosopher, author, scholar, imam, commentator of hadith, astronomer, jurist, and was one of the prominent scholars of Pakistan. Fatḥ Allāh bi-khaṣā'iṣ al-ism Allāh is ''considered his most prominent work.

Early life and education 
Sheikh Muhammad Musa Bazi Rouhani Bin Maulvi Sher Muhammad Al Bazi was born in Kathah Khel, a village in the district of Dera Ismail Khan, Khyber Pakhtunkhwa, Pakistan.

His grandfather was a resident of the town of Ghazni, Afghanistan, and his grandfather's name was Syed Sheikh Ahmad al-Rohani and his grave is at the foot of one of the mountains of Ghazni.

He studied theology at the behest of his mother and per his father's wish.

Allama al-Bazi taught the first books of jurisprudence and all Persian books to certain village scholars, and this is in line with his home schooling method in Pakistan, where Persian books are required for students to read. And in Pakistan it means Persian poetry books.

After that, Shaykh al-Allamah al-Bazi al-Ruhani went to the town of Isa Khel to seek knowledge on the authority of some scholars, and this was his first trip when he was less than eleven years old.

He started studying al-Sarf and in several months he memorized many books from him under the supervision of Sheikh Mufti Mahmud and he went with him to many villages and there he learned all the books of al-Sarf up to Akbariya chapters, and memorized Ibn al-Hajib's Kitab al-Kafiyyah and some books on syntax and logic.
Then he went with his Sheikh Mufti Mahmood to the village of Abdul Khel. So he stayed with him there for two years and he read to him the summary of the commentary and meanings of al-Jama'i.
He then traveled to Akora Khattak, and stayed there for about two years at Jamia Darul Uloom Al-Haqaniyyah.

He traveled from Akora Khattak to Rawalpindi, Pakistan, during the annual vacation in the month of Ramadan. So he recited the translation and commentary of the Quran to Sheikh Ghulamullah Khan, who was the most expert commentator of his time.

He then went to Multan and got admission in Jamia Qasim Uloom. He stayed there for three years, and then graduated.

Writings 
Shaykh al-Bazi al-Ruhani wrote in every art, and his classifications number about three hundred. Some of them are in print, some in manuscript, some in Arabic, some in Urdu and Persian, and some of his books have been translated into English and others. His famous works include:

 Al-Kanz al-aʻẓam fī taʻyīn al-Ism al-ʻAẓam
 
 Rizq-i ḥalāl va g̲h̲aibī maʻāsh-i Auliyāʼ, musammī bih, targ̲h̲ībulmuslimīn
 Fatḥ Allāh bi-khaṣā'iṣ al-ism Allāh 
 Fatḥ al-ʻalīm bi-ḥall ishkāl al-tashbīh al-ʻaẓīm fī ḥadīth "Kamā ṣallayta ʻalá Ibrāhīm"
 Bughyat al-kāmil al-sāmī : sharḥ al-Maḥṣūl wa-al-ḥāsil lil-Jāmī ; maʻa al-Ṭarīq al-ʻādil ilá bughyat al-Kāmil
 Muqaddimat sharḥ al-Bayḍāwī al-musammāt As̲mār al-Takmīl limā fī Anwār al-tanzīl
 Al-Hayʼat al-Ṣughraʹ maʻ sharḥhā Madār al-Bushrā

Death and legacy 
He died at the age of sixty-three on 27 Jumadi al-Thani 1419 AH, corresponding to 19 October 1998.

Sheikh Al-Bazi left four sons, each of whom is a scholar. The first among them is Sheikh Muhammad Zubair al-Rohani al-Bazi, second is Muhammad Uzair al-Ruhani al-Bazi, third is Muhammad Zubair al-Ruhani, and fourth is Abdul Rahman Rouhani.

Many scholars and students have praised Sheikh Al-Bazi, even the Imam of the Great Mosque of Makkah, Sheikh Muhammad bin Abdullah Al-Sabil, who said: "Scholars and Sheikhs from all over the world come to me, but I have not seen any scholar who is more knowledgeable and more correct than Al-Shaykh".

References 

Pages with unreviewed translations
1935 births
1998 deaths
Death in Lahore
Islamic philosophers
Pakistani astronomers
People from Dera Ismail Khan District
People from Lahore
Darul Uloom Haqqania alumni
Jamia Qasim Ul Uloom alumni
Deobandis